A sulphobe is a film composed of formaldehyde and thiocyanates alleged to have lifelike properties. Sulphobes were a subject in the researches of Alfonso L. Herrera, a biologist who studied the origin of life.

References

Further reading
 

 

Evolutionarily significant biological phenomena
Evolutionary biology
Origin of life